Jérôme Segal (born 1970) is a French-Austrian essayist and historian, lecturer at Sorbonne University and a researcher and journalist in Vienna. He is also known for his contributions in the field of animal law. He is the author of several articles and books, in particular on Jewishness and animal advocacy.

Education and career 
Segal was born in France in 1970. He began his graduate studies by obtaining an engineering degree from the École centrale de Lyon in 1993. More interested in the human sciences than in engineering, he reconciled his career and his ambitions by orienting himself towards the history of science and completed a DEA, then a doctorate between Lyon and Berlin from 1993 to 1998, on the history of information theory in the second half of the 20th century. He then continued this post-doctoral work at the Max Planck Institute for the History of Science, before returning to France, to Paris, during the summer of 2000 to work as a lecturer in the history of science and epistemology at IUFM in Paris and in parallel as a researcher at the Cavaillès Center of the École normale supérieure.

Segal moved to Austria in 2004 as an academic and scientific cooperation attaché at the French Embassy in Vienna. He continued in Vienna, from 2008, a career as a researcher in social sciences at the Interdisciplinary Center for Comparative Research in Social Sciences (ICCR) (2008 to 2011), as coordinator of the doctoral college of history and philosophy of sciences of University of Vienna (2011 to 2014) and associate researcher at the Ludwig Boltzmann Institute for Social History (2014 to 2016). Since 2016, Segal has resumed his post as a lecturer at Sorbonne University (within INSPE Paris).

Work

Writing 
Segal defines himself as an "interventionist" and "pathological writer". He seeks to discuss with the public issues that he considers important. Since 2008, he has maintained a blog entitled Le petit flambeau – L’Autriche vue par un universitaire français ("The little torch - Austria as seen by a French academic"), dealing among other things with Austrian politics, racism and secularism. Since 2008, he has been the author of more than 70 news articles, literary and cinematographic reviews and reviews published on the Nonfiction.fr site addressing the previously mentioned themes, as well as animal rights, or even preparation for running a marathon. He is also a writer for the antispeciesism journal L'Amorce ("The Primer"). Segal is also a journalist, working as a French media correspondent in Austria and has authored dozens of articles since 2002.

Activism 
Jérôme Segal is an advocate against racism and for helping refugees in Austria. Since his discovery in Montreuil, in 2001, of the situation of the Roma in Europe, he has been involved in the community, as an activist and intellectual, notably with two articles published in the review Les Temps modernes.

An advocate for animal rights, he practices veganism and is committed to antispeciesism. Several of his books and articles advocate for animal rights. He is also a member in Austria of the Team Vegan sports association. In France, he was a candidate of the Animalist Party in the 2019 European election.

Segal also advocates against the sexual mutilation of minors, more precisely the subject of circumcision, which he condemns in the name of the right of children to their physical integrity. He tackles this subject from a historical point of view in his book Athée et Juif, as well as in newspaper articles and journals.

Jewishness 
Segal's paternal grandfather fled Austria in May 1938 for France, before entering the Foreign Legion and then the Resistance where he met the Segal's grandmother. Segal is very interested in the question of Jewishness and defines himself as an "atheist Jew". From 2006 to 2011, he collaborated on the organization of the Vienna International Jewish Film Festival, while working on the Euro-Festival project, aimed at studying festivals as places of debate and identity construction.

Marathon running 
Segal is an experienced marathoner. Since 2003, he claims four to five marathons or ultramarathons per year, running in 15 different countries.

Publications 
In Le zéro et le un ("Zero and one"), Segal shows how information theory was constituted, taking into account the particular context of the Cold War, where the industrial sector, military research and university research were working to establish the first computer networks. He remarks "how much the theory of information could have been the object of ideological, political and social stakes" in its first years.

Animal radical, is an essay on the history and sociology of antispeciesism. This work presents the construction of this ideology from ancient Greece to Israel, including anarchism. Although himself a vegan and antispeciesist, Segal also presents the excesses of neo-pagan sects or towards political violence.

Author

Books 
 L'armoire ("The Wardrobe"; in French), Valensin – David Reinharc, 2020.
 Animal radical: Histoire et sociologie de l’antispécisme ("Radical animal: The History and Sociology of Antispeciesism"; in French), Lux, 2020.
 Vegan: Mehr denn je! ("Vegan: More Than Ever!"; in German), Konturen, 2020.
 Wie ein roter Faden ("Like a Common Thread"; in German), Konturen, 2019.
 Judentum: über die Religion hinaus ("Judaism: Beyond religion"; in German), Konturen, 2017.
 Athée et Juif: Fécondité d’un paradoxe apparent ("Atheist and Jew: Fertility of an Apparent Paradox"; in French), Editions Matériologiques, 2016.
 Le Zéro et le Un, Histoire de la notion scientifique d’information au XXe siècle ("The Zero and the One, History of the scientific notion of information in the 20th century"; in French), Editions Matériologiques, 2011.

Chapters 
 La pensée végane: 50 regards sur la question animale (articles: "Gastronomie végétalienne" and "Action directe"; in French), edited by Renan Larue, Presses Universitaires de France, 2020.
 Les Nationalistes à l'assaut de l'Europe (article: "Autriche: Quand le nationalisme issu de l’extrême droite devient majoritaire"; in French), edited by Dominique Vidal, Demopolis, 2020.
 Festivals and the Cultural Public Sphere (article: "Cannes: 'A French International Festival'"), edited by Gerard Delanty, Liana Giorgi, Monica Sassatelli, London/New York: Routledge, 2011 (written with C. Blumauer, PDF).
 La Galicie au temps des Habsbourg (1772–1918) Histoire, société, cultures en contact (article: "L'or noir contre l'étoile jaune, mobilités particulières des Juifs de Galicie ayant investi dans le pétrole"; in French), edited by Jacques Le Rider and Heinz Raschel, Presses Universitaires François Rabelais, 2010 (translation: "Black Gold and Yellow StarForms of mobility of Galician Jews investing in the oil business").

See also
 List of animal rights advocates

References

External links
 

1970 births
Living people
21st-century French essayists
21st-century French historians
21st-century French journalists
21st-century French male writers
Animal rights scholars
French anti-racism activists
Academic staff of the University of Vienna
Journalists from Vienna
French animal rights activists
French bloggers
French marathon runners
French veganism activists
Historians of animal rights
Jewish activists
Jewish atheists
Jewish historians
Jewish journalists
Jewish French writers
Academic staff of Paris-Sorbonne University
Austrian animal rights activists
Austrian male marathon runners